Molteno is a surname of Italian origin. Rare in Italy itself, it is occasionally found in the Italian diaspora. Due to an early presence in Africa and generations of intermarriage, it has also become a South African surname, and it is especially common among Xhosa-speaking people. 

Notable people with the surname include:

Sir John Charles Molteno (1814–1886), The first Prime Minister of the Cape Colony
Elizabeth Maria Molteno (1852–1927), early suffragette and civil rights activist 
John Charles Molteno, Jr. (1860–1924), Cape exporter and parliamentarian
Percy Molteno (1861–1937), Shipping magnate and Liberal member of parliament
Sir James Tennant Molteno (1865–1936), The first Speaker of the South African Parliament
Vincent Barkly Molteno (1872–1952), Admiral of the Royal Navy in World War I
Donald Barkly Molteno (1908–1972), also called Dilizintaba. Barrister and anti-apartheid leader